Convergence proof techniques are canonical components of mathematical proofs that sequences or functions converge to a finite limit when the argument tends to infinity.

There are many types of series and modes of convergence requiring different techniques.  Below are some of the more common examples.  This article is intended as an introduction aimed to help practitioners explore appropriate techniques.  The links below give details of necessary conditions and generalizations to more abstract settings.  The convergence of series is already covered in the article on convergence tests.

Convergence in Rn
It is common to want to prove convergence of a sequence  or function , where  and  refer to the natural numbers and the real numbers, and convergence is with respect to the Euclidean norm, .

Useful approaches for this are as follows.

First principles

Contraction mappings
In many cases, the function whose convergence is of interest has the form  for some transformation .

Example
Famous example of the use of this approach include

Convergent subsequences
Every bounded sequence in  has a convergent subsequence, by the Bolzano–Weierstrass theorem.  If these all have the same limit, then the original sequence converges to that limit.  If it can be shown that all of the subsequences of  have the same limit, such as by showing that there is a unique fixed point of the transformation , then the initial sequence must also converge to that limit.

Monotonicity (Lyapunov functions)
Every bounded monotonic sequence in  converges to a limit.

This approach can also be applied to sequences that are not monotonic. If the  satisfies the conditions to be a Lyapunov function then  is convergent. Lyapunov's theorem is normally stated for ordinary differential equations, but can also be applied to sequences of iterates by replacing derivatives with discrete differences.

  for all  and 
  be "radially unbounded", so that  goes to infinity for any sequence with  that tends to infinity.

In many cases, a Lyapunov function of the form  can be found, although more complex forms are also used.

For delay differential equations, a similar approach applies with Lyapunov functions replaced by Lyapunov functionals also called Lyapunov-Krasovskii functionals.

If the inequality in the condition 1 is weak, LaSalle's invariance principle may be used.

Convergence of sequences of functions
To consider the convergence of sequences of functions, it is necessary to define a distance between functions to replace the Euclidean norm.  These often include
For this case, all of the above techniques can be applied with this function norm.
 Pointwise convergence -- convergence occurs if for each , .
 uniform convergence -- In pointwise convergence, some (open) regions can converge arbitrarily slowly.  With uniform convergence, there is a fixed convergence rate such that all points converge at least that fast.  Formally,  where  is the domain of each .

See also
 Convergence of Fourier series

Convergence of random variables
(Formally, a random variable is a mapping  from an event space  to a value space .

There are multiple types of convergence, depending on the how the distance between functions is measured.
 Convergence in distribution -- pointwise convergence of the distribution functions of the random variables to the limit
 Convergence in probability
 Convergence in the mean
Each has its own proof techniques, which are beyond the current scope of this article.

See also
 Dominated convergence
 Carlson's theorem establishing the pointwise (Lebesgue) almost everywhere convergence of Fourier series of L2 functions
 Doob's martingale convergence theorems  a random variable analogue of the monotone convergence theorem

Topological convergence
For all of the above techniques, some form the basic analytic definition of convergence above applies.  However, topology has its own definition of convergence.  For example, in a non-hausdorff space, it is possible for a sequence to converge to multiple different limits.

References

mathematics